Fritz Buehning and Tom Gullikson were the defending champions, but Gullikson did not compete this year.

Buehning teamed up with Ferdi Taygan and lost in the final to Kevin Curren and Wojciech Fibak. The score was 6–4, 6–4.

Seeds

Draw

Draw

References
 Official results archive (ATP)
 Official results archive (ITF)

1984 ABN World Tennis Tournament